The Education and Skills Act 2008 (c 25) is an Act of the Parliament of the United Kingdom that raised the minimum age at which a person can leave education or training from 16 to 18 for those born after 1 September 1997, with an interim minimum leaving age of 17 from 2013. The Act also introduced a number of other changes including the right of choice and appeal for young people regarding their sixth form college, and placing duties on the Learning and Skills Council regarding payment and finance of courses for both children and adults.

See also
Education Act

References
Halsbury's Statutes,

Career development in the United Kingdom
Department for Children, Schools and Families
United Kingdom Acts of Parliament 2008
United Kingdom Education Acts
Youth employment